Caylor may refer to:

Caylor, Virginia, an unincorporated community in Lee County

People with the name Caylor
O. P. Caylor (1849–1897), American baseball newspaper columnist and major league baseball team manager